A sumatralith is an oval to rectangular shaped stone artefact made by unifacially flaking around the circumference of a cobble. It is often used to infer the Hoabinhian character of a lithic assemblage.

References 

 Nishimura M. 1994. Attribute analysis of the Hoabinhian industry: Implications from a comparative study of Bung cave and Xom Trai cave, Northern Vietnam. Vietnam Social Sciences 5: 75-87
 Van Tan, H. A. (1997). The Hoabinhian and before. Bulletin of the Indo-Pacific Prehistory Association, 16, 35–41.

Lithics